Casa Feliz, or "Happy House" in Spanish, is the signature residential work of noted architect James Gamble Rogers II. Initially known as the Barbour Estate, this Andalusian-style masonry farmhouse has significantly influenced the architectural and cultural aspects of this community. This house is one of Rogers' best-known residences in Florida. In 2000, in order to save it from destruction, the city of Winter Park moved it to its current location at 656 Park Avenue North in Winter Park. On December 31, 2008, it was added to the United States National Register of Historic Places.

History
In 1932, Robert Barbour, who owned a company that manufactured chemical dyes, asked James Rogers to design him a home. The house was completed in 1933. The Barbour family frequently hosted community events at their house, including the Spanish Institute of Florida's annual party, giving it the name Casa Feliz in the 1960s. In 1951, the Barbour family sold the property and in 2000, the City of Winter Park acquired the building.

Design
Rogers created a gracious residence, with large public rooms. The living room opens to a garden on one side and a courtyard on the other; the dining room also opens to this courtyard. Along the garden front is an arched loggia that connects the living room, entrance hall and library. The home also features an arched porte cochere.

The interior of "Casa Feliz" is refurbished to its original condition. The living room has a vaulted ceiling with massive hand-hewn beams. The public spaces of the house are the living and dining rooms, library, courtyards and detached garden room (formerly the garage). Typical James Gamble Rogers II details include the majolica-tiled interior courtyard and fountain, arched doorways and a circular staircase.

The exterior of "Casa Feliz" and grounds feature original Spanish roof tiles and whitewashed bricks, a turret, a bell tower and a heavy timber balcony, lush landscaping, courtyards, oaks and native plants contained by clay amphoras.

Recent history
Originally the house stood at 656 North Interlachen Avenue bordering one of Winter Park's lakes with the garden front of the house facing the lake. It stood there for about seventy years. In 2000, the then-owner began to demolish the house. The City of Winter Park acquired the house and relocated it 900 feet to city-owned property.

Casa Feliz Historic House Museum
The Casa Feliz historic house museum has a permanent exhibit that focuses on the life and works of architect James Gamble Rogers II. The estate has been restored to reflect its original 1930s appearance and serves as a Winter Park and Orlando wedding venue.

References

External links

 Casa Feliz Historic House Museum - official site

Houses in Orange County, Florida
Historic house museums in Florida
National Register of Historic Places in Orange County, Florida
Museums in Orange County, Florida
Museums established in 1932
Buildings and structures in Winter Park, Florida
Event venues on the National Register of Historic Places in Florida
Houses completed in 1932